Gefen Primo (born ) is an Israeli judoka. She competes in the under 52 kg weight category, and won bronze medals in the 2021 World Judo Championships, 2018 European Judo Championships and 2021 European Judo Championships.

Early life
Primo was born in moshav Gan HaShomron, Israel, to a Jewish family. Her mother Meirav Primo is a board member of the Israel Judo Association since 2016. Her younger brother Einav Primo and her younger sister Kerem Primo are both judokas as well. As of 2015, she moved with her family to moshav Kfar Netter, Israel, to be closer to the judo trainings at the Wingate Institute in the city of Netanya, Israel.

She was enlisted as a soldier in the Israeli Air Force in 2019, which designated her to an excellent sportsperson status.

Career
In 2017, primo placed 2nd at the under-18 European championships, won the European Youth Summer Olympic Festival and placed 3rd in the under-21 European championships in Maribor, Slovenia after defeating Buyankhishig Purevsuren of Azerbaijan for the bronze medal.

On 3 February 2018, Primo competed at her first international senior competition at the 'Odivelas European Open' in Portugal and won a bronze medal when she defeated Lyudmyla Pliieva of Ukraine on the medal match. On 9 March, she won her first IJF World Tour medal when she won a bronze medal at the 2018 Agadir Grand Prix.

On 26 April 2018, Primo took part in the European Championships in Tel Aviv and won a bronze medal in the under 52 kg weight category, becoming the youngest Israeli judoka to win a European championships medal. In the first round she defeated Sofia Asvesta of Cyprus by waza-ari and ippon, in the second round she defeated Charline Van Snick of Belgium by ippon. In the quarter finals she lost to Evelyne Tschopp of Switzerland. She went on to defeat Anja Stangar of Slovenia in the repechage and reached the bronze medal match where she defeated Irem Korkmaz of Turkey by two waza-ari after her opponent scored one.

On 18 October 2018, Primo won the silver medal at the 2018 World Junior Championships.

At the 2021 Judo Grand Slam Abu Dhabi held in Abu Dhabi, United Arab Emirates, she won one of the bronze medals in her event.

Titles
Source:

See also
List of Jews in sports
Israel Judo Association
Israel national judo team

References

External links
 
 
 Gefen Primo at the European Judo Union
 

2000 births
Living people
Israeli female judoka
Jewish martial artists
Jewish Israeli sportspeople
Israeli female athletes
Israeli Jews
People from Haifa District
21st-century Israeli women